Delightful may refer to:

Delightful, Ohio, a community in the United States
Queen Delightful, fictional character in The 7D
"Delightful", single by Narada Michael Walden from Garden of Love Light 1977
"Delightful", single by the Happy Mondays from Loads (album) 1995
Delightful E.P., another name for Forty Five E.P. debut E.P. from Happy Mondays 1995
Delightful (Ami Suzuki song) 2005